The Massachusetts Secretary of the Commonwealth is the principal public information officer of the government of the U.S. state of Massachusetts. It is the equivalent of what most other states call the Secretary of State.

The Secretary of the Commonwealth oversees the Corporations Division, the Elections Division, the Massachusetts Archives, the Massachusetts Historical Commission, the Public Records Division, the Securities Division, as well as the State Records Center.

William F. Galvin has held the office since 1995.

Qualifications
Any person seeking to become Secretary of the Commonwealth of Massachusetts must meet the following requirements:
 Be at least eighteen years of age
 Be a registered voter in Massachusetts
 Be a Massachusetts resident for at least five years when elected
 Receive 5,000 signatures from registered voters on nomination papers

List of secretaries of the Commonwealth (1780 to present)

See also 
 Attorney General of Massachusetts
 Political party strength in Massachusetts

References

External links 
 Official site
 . (Various documents).

Massachusetts-related lists